24 Hours in London is a 2000 British crime thriller film directed by Alexander Finbow and starring Gary Olsen and Anjela Lauren Smith.  The film takes place in London in the year 2009.

Plot
Crime lord Christian controls the streets of London. He decides to exterminate a rival gang but leaves a witness in the process. Martha, the witness, is being protected by the police but Christian's gang is unstoppable. After her near-death experience in the police station, she is moved to another location to meet up with undercover officers, but the officer she meets is actually a criminal impersonating the officer that he and his accomplice have just harvested organs from.

At the end, as Christian is dying in a hotel room, we learn that the protagonist is actually a mole for Christian and that one of Christian's thugs is romantically involved with Martha. It turns out that Martha and her lover Tony hired the organ harvesters who are caught up in the middle, Christian is dead, the good/bad cop is left to die, and the organ harvesters and the con couple (Martha and Tony) leave. After their departure, the police force enters the room and the commissioner gives a nod signaling them to leave.

Cast
Gary Olsen as Christian
Tony London as Leon
David Sonnethal as Bubbles Healy
Sara Stockbridge as Simone
Luke Garrett as Richard
Wendy Cooper as Antonia
Anjela Lauren Smith as Martha
John Sharian as Tony
Lorelei King as Lloyd
Sean Francis as Samuel
Katia Caballero as Michelle
Richard Graham as Novell
Morgan Jones as Sean
Jeremy Beckman as Floyd
Olegario Fedoro as Mobster Koloshnakov

References

External links

24 Hours in London at Rotten Tomatoes

2000 films
2000 crime thriller films
British crime thriller films
2000s English-language films
2000s French-language films
2000s Russian-language films
2000 multilingual films
British multilingual films
2000s British films